Cytochrome c oxidase subunit 8A (COX8A) is a protein that in humans is encoded by the COX8A gene. Cytochrome c oxidase 8A is a subunit of the cytochrome c oxidase complex, also known as Complex IV. Mutations in the COX8A gene have been associated with complex IV deficiency with Leigh syndrome and epilepsy.

Structure 

COX8A is a 7.6 kDa protein composed of 69 amino acids. This gene encodes the nuclear-encoded subunit 8A of the human mitochondrial respiratory chain enzyme complex cytochrome c oxidase. The complex consists of 13 mitochondrial- and nuclear-encoded subunits.

Function 

Cytochrome c oxidase (COX) is the terminal enzyme of the mitochondrial respiratory chain. It is a multi-subunit enzyme complex that couples the transfer of electrons from cytochrome c to molecular oxygen and contributes to a proton electrochemical gradient across the inner mitochondrial membrane. The mitochondrially-encoded subunits perform the electron transfer of proton pumping activities. The functions of the nuclear-encoded subunits are unknown but they may play a role in the regulation and assembly of the complex.

Clinical significance 
COX8A is a subunit of cytochrome c oxidase and its function is important for the efficacy of complex IV. Mutations in COX8A can affect complex IV of the electron transport chain, resulting in complex IV deficiency. This disorder can have a wide range of clinical manifestations including Leigh syndrome, leukodystrophy, and severe epilepsy.

Interactions 
COX8A has been shown to have 19 binary protein-protein interactions including 7 co-complex interactions. COX8A appears to interact with NPM1, MAGEA4, EDDM3B, BATF, AMBP, CREB1, and NCOR1.

References

External links 
 
Mass spectrometry characterization of COX8A at COPaKB